Sun Ruyong (12 June 1927 – 14 February 2020) was a Chinese ecologist. He was a member of the Ecological Society of China and served as its president between November 1987 and October 1991.

Biography
Sun was born in Ningbo, Zhejiang, on June 12, 1927. In September 1940, he attended the Ningbo County Private Three-One Middle School. On October 27, 1940, the Japanese Unit 731 dropped a bacterial bomb on the downtown area of Ningbo, and the plague broke out suddenly, killing more than 100 people in just ten days. On April 19, 1941, the Imperial Japanese Army occupied Ningbo, and the school was forced to disband. In 1942 he was accepted to Ningbo Normal High School, where he met Li Pingzhi, a music teacher who had a profound impact on him. After graduation, due to the Nationalist government not recognizing his education background, he had to wait for work at home. With the help of Li Pingzhi, he then taught at Shanghai Tangshanlu School. In 1949, he enrolled at Beijing Normal University, majoring in the Department of Biology. After graduating in 1951, he taught at the university as an assistant. He joined the Communist Party of China in 1952. After a year's study at Beijing Russian Institute, he was sent to study at Moscow State University, where he obtained a Candidate of Sciences degree under the supervision of Haymob. He returned to China in 1958 and continued to teach at Beijing Normal University, where he was promoted to associate professor in 1978 and to full professor in 1984. In October 1983, he led the team to Belgium for academic research. He died of myocardial infarction in Guangzhou, Guangdong, on February 14, 2020, aged 92.

Works

Translations

Honours and awards
 1993 Member of the Chinese Academy of Sciences (CAS)

References

1927 births
2020 deaths
Educators from Ningbo
Scientists from Ningbo
Academic staff of Beijing Normal University
Beijing Normal University alumni
Moscow State University alumni
Chinese ecologists
Members of the Chinese Academy of Sciences